Omorgus consanguineus is a species of hide beetle in the subfamily Omorginae and subgenus Afromorgus.

References

consanguineus
Beetles described in 1901